Martha Lucía Ospina Martínez is a Colombian epidemiologist and doctor who specializes in public health management who was the director of the National Institute of Health (INS) until Her last day on October 31, 2022 when she went to work for the Omic Sconces Laboratory.  a native of Cali, she had previously served as the Ministry of Health’s National Director of Epidemiology and Demography and director of the High Cost Diseases Account.

Education
She is a graduate of the Pontifical Xavierian University Faculty of Medicine, where she specialized in public health management.  Ospina also has a master’s degree in epidemiology from University of Valle and master's degree in economics from Pompeu Fabra University.

References

Living people
Colombian epidemiologists
Women epidemiologists
Colombian public health doctors
Women physicians
Year of birth missing (living people)

University of Valle alumni
Pontifical Xavierian University alumni
Pompeu Fabra University alumni
People from Cali